Malapterurus stiassnyae is a species of electric catfish native to Guinea, Liberia and Sierra Leone. Members of this species grow to a length of  SL.

References

Malapteruridae
Fish of West Africa
Taxa named by Steven Mark Norris
Fish described in 2002
Strongly electric fish